Hoshikawa (written: 星川 lit. "star river") is a Japanese surname. Notable people with the surname include:

, Japanese professional wrestler
, Japanese cross-country skier

Fictional characters
, a character in the tokusatsu television series Chikyuu Sentai Fiveman
, a character in the anime series Reideen
, a character in the anime series Re:Creators
, a character in the manga series New Game!
, a character in the manga series Blend S
, a character in the video game Bullet Girls
, a character in the anime series Day Break Illusion
, a character in the manga series My Girlfriend is Shobitch
, protagonist of the video game Shooting Star Rockman
, a character in the manga series Goodnight Punpun

See also 
 7429 Hoshikawa, a main-belt asteroid
 Hoshikawa Station (disambiguation), multiple railway stations in Japan

Japanese-language surnames